The 23rd Division() was created In January 1949 under the Regulation of the Redesignations of All Organizations and Units of the Army, issued by Central Military Commission on November 1, 1948, basing on the 14th Independent Brigade, 8th Column of PLA Northwestern Field Army. Its history could be traced to 14th Independent Brigade of Jinsui Military District formed in September 1948.

The division is part of 8th Corps. Under the flag of 23rd division it took part in the Chinese civil war. 

In November 1949 the division was inactivated and absorbed by 22nd Division.

As of disbandment division was composed of:
67th Regiment;
68th Regiment;
69th Regiment.

References

中国人民解放军各步兵师沿革，http://blog.sina.com.cn/s/blog_a3f74a990101cp1q.html

Infantry divisions of the People's Liberation Army
Military units and formations established in 1949
Military units and formations disestablished in 1949